Thar Jath Airstrip is an airport in South Sudan.

Location
Thar Jath Airstrip  is located in Guit County, Fangak State, in north central South Sudan, near the town of Duar.

The geographic coordinates of this airport are: 8° 46' 55.24"N, 30° 7' 52.42"E (Latitude: 8.782013; Longitude: 30.131228). The elevation of Thar Jath Airstrip is unknown. The airport has a single unpaved runway, the dimensions of which are not publicly known at this time.

Overview
Thar Jath Airstrip is a small civilian airport that serves the town of Duar and surrounding communities. It also serves the Thar Jath oil field. There are no known scheduled airlines serving this airport at this time, but the United Nations Humanitarian Air Service served the field from Rumbek Airport.

External links
 Location of Thar Jath Airstrip At Google Maps

See also
 Block 5A, South Sudan
 Unity State
 List of airports in South Sudan

References

Airports in South Sudan
Greater Upper Nile